Unreal Ads is an Australian television show showcasing advertisements and weird video footage. It was aired on Network Ten in 2000. It had hosted by Tim Ferguson.

References

Network 10 original programming
2000s Australian reality television series
2000 Australian television series debuts
2000 Australian television series endings
1990s Australian television series